Myślibórz Mały  is a village in the administrative district of Gmina Nowe Warpno, within Police County, West Pomeranian Voivodeship, in north-western Poland, close to the German border.

For the history of the region, see History of Pomerania.

The village has a population of 4.

References

Villages in Police County